Bo Göran Edward Marby (March 22, 1963) is a Swedish businessman who serves as the CEO and President of the Internet Corporation for Assigned Names and Numbers (ICANN), a non-profit
corporation based in California.

Early life
Marby is from Sweden. He received a Bachelor of Science in Finance from the University of Gothenburg (School of Business, Economics and Law).

Career
Marby has been the Director-General of the Swedish Post and Telecom Authority (PTS). Earlier he co-founded AppGate Network Security AB, a security software company. He has also worked as CEO of Cygate (a network services company), Country Manager for Cisco in Sweden, and as CEO of Unisource Business Networks in Sweden.

Head of ICANN 
He has been CEO and President of ICANN since May 2016. Göran Marby resigned Dec 21, 2022 as ICANN President and Chief Executive Officer

In September 2016, he testified at a US Senate subcommittee meeting in support of the so-called "IANA transition", whereby oversight of ICANN would pass from the US government to the multi-stakeholder ICANN community.

Personal life
Marby is married and has three children. He lives in Los Angeles.

References

External links

 Profile on the ICANN website

Living people
1963 births
Swedish Internet celebrities
University of Gothenburg alumni
Swedish businesspeople
People from Gothenburg